Brad Tassell is a former Australian professional rugby league player and executive. A winger, he played nine games in the NSWRL for the Eastern Suburbs between 1987 and 1989. Tassell also served as the chief executive officer of the Papua New Guinea Hunters until his resignation in 2015.

Born in Mount Isa, Queensland, Tassell's brothers, Jason and Kris, also played rugby league.

In 2016, Hasell unsuccessfully stood as a candidate in the Division of Leichhardt for Katter's Australian Party.

References

Year of birth missing (living people)
Living people
Australian rugby league players
Rugby league players from Mount Isa
Rugby league administrators
Sydney Roosters players